The 2009–10 season was Olympiacos's 51st consecutive season in the Super League Greece and their 84th year in existence. Olympiacos finished 2nd in the regular season of the Greek Super League and ranked last at the play-off games, resulting in a 5th place at the League, the worst position of team's recent seasons. Olympiacos also participated in UEFA Champions League 2009–10, and managed to qualify to the knock-stage (round of 16). They lost twice from French side Bordeaux, 3–1 on aggregate.

This season was the last season with Sokratis Kokkalis as chairman of the club. The 5th league position as well as the team's low level of spectacle created a disappointing atmosphere, resulting in Kokkalis's decision to leave the club after two decades of constant presence.

Events

 27 May 2009: Former Georgian international player Temuri Ketsbaia is appointed coach, replacing Ernesto Valverde from Spain.
 19 June 2009: Antonios Nikopolidis, Dudu, and Luciano Galletti are appointed captains for the 2009–10 season.
 23 June 2009: Swedish international Olof Mellberg is signed from Serie A sides Juventus. Matt Derbyshire is also signed from Premier League team Blackburn Rovers after previously being on loan with Olympiacos.
 15 September 2009: Manager Temuri Ketsbaia is sacked despite not conceding a single goal in his time at the club he was replaced with Božidar Bandović who hasn't impressed at Olympiacos.

Teams and players 2009–10

First team
Roster update: 01 August 2009

Out on loan

Players from the youth system

Foreign players

Technical & Medical Staff

Reserves team
As on: 21 August 2009,
Source: Olympiacos F.C. U21 Team

Transfers

Summer transfers

In:

 Total spending:  €6.85 million

Out:

Total income:  €5 million

Competitions

Super League Greece

Classification

Results summary

Results by round

Matches
All times at EET

Play-offs

Greek Cup

Fourth round
All times at EET

UEFA Champions League

Third qualifying round
All times at EET

Play-off round
All times at EET

Group stage
All times at EET

Standings

Knockout stage

Round of 16
All times at EET

Team kit

References

External links
 Olympiacos F.C. official website
 Olympiacos F.C. on ESPN
 UEFA Champions League

Olympiacos F.C. seasons
Olympiacos F.C.